Belawa is a village  in Bansgadhi Municipality, Bardiya District in Lumbini Province of south-western Nepal. At the time of the 2011 Nepal census it had a population of 15,568 people living in 3,235 individual households. There were 7,447 males and 8,121 females at the time of census.

References

Populated places in Bardiya District